Declan may refer to:
 Declán of Ardmore (fl. 5th century), Irish religious leader
 Declan (given name), including a list of people with the name
 Declan (album), by Declan Galbraith